The 2011 Saransk Cup was a professional tennis tournament played on clay courts. It was the 1st edition of the tournament which was part of the 2011 ITF Women's Circuit. It took place in Saransk, Russia between 5 and 11 September 2011.

WTA entrants

Seeds

 1 Rankings are as of August 29, 2011.

Other entrants
The following players received wildcards into the singles main draw:
  Anastasia Frolova
  Margarita Gasparyan
  Ksenia Lykina
  Marina Melnikova

The following players received entry from the qualifying draw:
  Nadezda Gorbachkova
  Victoria Kan
  Daria Mironova
  Polina Rodionova

Champions

Singles

 Alexandra Panova def.  Marina Melnikova, 6–0, 6–2

Doubles

 Mihaela Buzărnescu /  Teodora Mirčić def.  Eva Hrdinová /  Veronika Kapshay, 6–3, 6–1

External links
Official Website
ITF Search 

Saransk Cup
2011 in Russian tennis
Saransk Cup